John M. Picard served as  the tenth Mayor of the City of West Haven, Connecticut from December 2005 to December 2013.

Political life
Picard was elected in 2005, succeeding Mayor Joseph Cullen who had served as mayor for a period of only two weeks.  Cullen was Chairman of the West Haven City Council when Mayor H. Richard Borer, Jr. chose to retire from office after he lost the general election to Picard. Borer, a Democrat, was elected mayor in 1991. Picard challenged him in the 2003 Democratic primary but lost.

Choosing not to endure another primary, Borer formed his own political party called A Better Future Party in 2005.  A Better Future Party ran a full slate of candidates in the 2005 General Election.  Although the party took the minority positions on the City Council and Board of Education,  Borer lost to Picard by 73 votes.  In 2007, Mayor Picard was re-elected after being challenged by A Better Future candidate Dorinda Borer, wife of former Mayor H. Richard Borer, Jr.

At the Democratic Party nominating convention, Picard shocked the crowd after he announced that he would not run for re-election.  Within days he changed his mind and accepted the nomination of the party. He defeated the A Better Future Party candidate, City Councilwoman Nancy Rossi and Republican Planning & Zoning Commissioner Steven Mullins. Rossi ran on the Better Future ticket for mayor and the Democratic ticket for her council seat that she was re-elected to.  Mullins still serves as Commissioner of Planning & Zoning in West Haven.

2013 Reelection Bid
Picard ran against fellow Democrat Edward M. O'Brien in a close election. After losing the primary to O'Brien, Picard ran as a write in candidate. Picard lost to O'Brien

Picard's administration has focused on economic development and tax relief in West Haven.

Picard is a graduate of Notre Dame High School and the University of New Haven, both in West Haven.  Prior to becoming mayor, he served as Chairman of the West Haven Water Pollution Control Commission.  In 1997 he was elected to the West Haven City Council.  He was re-elected to the Council in 1999 and 2001. In 2001 the City Council elected Picard Chairman of the City Council.

Personal life
Picard is married to Tara Riley Picard.
He is a financial advisor and teaches English as a Second Language.

References

See also
 

Connecticut Democrats
Mayors of places in Connecticut
University of New Haven alumni
Living people
West Haven, Connecticut
Year of birth missing (living people)